Highway 968 is a provincial highway in the far north region of the Canadian province of Saskatchewan. It serves local traffic around the northern town of Fond-du-Lac and the Fond du Lac Denesuline First Nation. It is about 2 km (1.2 mi) long and is not connected to any other highways except by a seasonal winter road.

See also
Roads in Saskatchewan
Transportation in Saskatchewan

References

968